Pernilla Maria Theresa Andersson Dregen ( Andersson; 10 December 1974) is a Swedish singer-songwriter. She is the singing coach for the TV program True Talent.

Career 

Andersson was born in Stockholm but grew up in Hässleholm and Kristianstad.

She sings "Blå vägen hem" on Svante Thuresson's album Svante Thuresson & vänner. She wrote the music of Thuresson's album Nya kickar and she produced his two last albums. As pianist she has been touring with Thomas Di Leva. In 2001 she received SKAP's scholarship.
She contested Melodifestivalen 2011 with the song Desperados and came to the "second chance" (andra chansen) but lost. In 2011, she received the Ulla-Billquist-scholarship.

Andersson is interested in ecology affecting fish and seeks to preserve the species of fish in the Baltic Sea.

Discography

Albums

Singles

References

External links 

 

1974 births
Living people
Singers from Stockholm
Swedish country singers
Swedish women songwriters
English-language singers from Sweden
Swedish-language singers
21st-century Swedish women singers
21st-century women guitarists
Melodifestivalen contestants of 2016
Melodifestivalen contestants of 2011